Too Many Winners is a 1947 American crime film directed by William Beaudine and starring Hugh Beaumont, Trudy Marshall and Ralph Dunn.

Plot
Private detective Michael Shayne and his girlfriend/secretary Phyllis are in the office ready to leave on a duck-hunting vacation but are puzzled when a mysterious stranger arrives who announces that he intended to offer a bribe to not take a certain unspecified case, but hearing that Shane is going away anyway, abruptly departs. The mystery deepens when Shayne is invited over by a Mayme Martin with an offer to sell certain valuable information which Shayne declines. Leaving Martin's, Shayne is ambushed by a pair of odd thugs under orders of their boss seeking to know what Martin told him, which was nothing; they beat up and leave Shayne in the city dump.

Now drawn in to an obvious situation, Shayne sends his reporter friend Tim Rourke to accept Martin's information offer, but instead Rourke encounters police and her murdered body.

It turns out that the mystery concerns criminal activity at the Santa Rosita racetrack. The president Albert Payson's track manager John Hardeman hires Shayne to solve a counterfeit ticket racket that is bankrupting the track. The printer for the legitimate tickets is a trusted company owned by Payson, and Hardeman alone decides on the tickets' secret daily design and code numbers.

The track offers one other lead. Gil Madden, owner of the Tribune, had long been trying to get the contract for printing the tickets. He had financed the purchase of the Tribune using as collateral a printing company he'd acquired from a prison inmate, a Theodore Ross.

Shayne recognizes Madden as the stranger who offered the bribe to drop the case and he won't answer questions. Madden's partner, photographer/engraver Ben Edwards, also refuses to be questioned.

As it turns out, Gil Madden is aka Theodore Ross and Ben Edwards is aka Claude Bates. Years ago they were convicted of together counterfeiting Irish sweepstakes tickets and sent to Joliet Penitentiary. Madden served a light sentence and was released but Edwards drew 20 to 50 and after two years, broke out. Edwards has acquired a wife and son who know nothing about his past.

Despite the efforts of Edwards to remake his life, inventing a new type of camera, sadly Hardeman figured out his identity and began blackmailing the escaped convict to force him to make the counterfeit racing tickets.

We are now at the point of the film where Hardeman fears Edwards will talk and directs his thugs to kill him, as he had ordered the death of Martin who knew about the blackmail. But just as he speaks this order into the phone, Edwards shows up to instead shoot and kill Hardeman; in turn as he is leaving, Edwards is shot and killed by Hardeman's thugs.

At the end, one thug reveals the other, Joe, as the killer of Martin and Edwards; Joe attacks and is shot by the other as police arrive and capture him. In the final scene, the police agree at Shane's request to spare Edwards' family from the truth, and Shane and Phyllis at last embark on their vacation.

Cast
 Hugh Beaumont as Michael Shayne 
 Trudy Marshall as Phyllis Hamilton 
 Ralph Dunn as Det. Peter Rafferty 
 Claire Carleton as Mayme Martin 
 Charles Mitchell as Tim Rourke 
 John Hamilton as Albert Payson 
 Grandon Rhodes as John Hardeman 
 Ben Welden as Gil Madden / Theodore Ross 
 Byron Foulger as Ben Edwards / Claude Bates 
 Jean Andren as Mary Edwards 
 George Meader as Clarence

References

Bibliography
 Marshall, Wendy L. William Beaudine: From Silents to Television. Scarecrow Press, 2005.

External links

1947 films
American crime films
American black-and-white films
1947 crime films
1940s English-language films
Films directed by William Beaudine
Producers Releasing Corporation films
1940s American films